Chad J. Finley (born March 17, 1992) is an American professional stock car racing driver and team owner. He last competed part-time in the NASCAR Gander Outdoors Truck Series, driving the No. 42 Chevrolet Silverado for Chad Finley Racing.

Racing career
Finley began his racing career at the age of 10. He finished third in the East Lansing Kart Track Championship points his first season and won the championship the following. He won the Great Lakes Sprint Series Championship and finished sixth in the World Karting Association (WKA) in 2005.

In 2006, Finley made his full-sized stock car debut with the ASA Late Model Series. His first full season in the full-sized stock car came in 2007 when at the age of 15 he won the Outlaw Super Late Model Rookie-of-the-Year award at Spartan Speedway (Mich.).

2008 saw many firsts for Finley. He scored his first career Outlaw Super Late Model feature win at Spartan Speedway (Mich.) and then visited victory lane again just a couple months later, this time driving a Template Pro Late Model in the Super Pro Late Model Series.

In 2009, saw Finley make the jump to the ARCA Racing Series driving for NASCAR Sprint Cup Champion Brad Keselowski. He won a pole award at Rockingham Speedway (N.C.), scored one top-five finish, and three top-10s in just four starts that season. Finley made seven starts in the ARCA Racing Series in 2010 where he tied his career best finish of third, twice. Those two top-three finishes came at Rockingham Speedway (N.C.) and Pocono Raceway (Pa.). Chad also raced events at major NASCAR venues such as Texas Motor Speedway (Tex.), and Michigan International Speedway (Mich.).

In 2011, Finley competed for JEGS/CRA All-Stars Tour Championship, finishing third in the overall points standings with five top-five finishes and eight top-10 finishes. He scored two season-high second-place finishes at Lucas Oil Raceway (Ind.) and Dixie Motor Speedway (Mich.) respectively.

In 2012, Finley scored his first career win in the JEGS/CRA All-Stars Tour at Columbus Motor Speedway (Ohio). He also won the Fast Qualifier Award in both the ARCA/CRA Super Series and JEGS/CRA All-Stars and finished the year with four top-five finishes and seven top-10 finishes.

In 2013, Finley ran events in both the ARCA/CRA Super Series and the JEGS/CRA All-Stars Tour, winning two races in the JEGS/CRA All-Stars Tour. He collected five-top five finishes as well as eight top-10 finishes that season as well. At South Alabama Speedway, Finley broke the track record during the 37th Running of the Rattler 250.

In 2014, Finley posted many solid finishes in both Pro and Super Late Model races around the country. He also ran select races in the NASCAR K&N Pro Series. At the end of the season, he moved to Mooresville, N.C., where he expanded Chad Finley Development. 

In 2015, Finley made his NASCAR Camping World Truck Series debut, driving the No. 30 Ford F-150 for Rette Jones Racing at Michigan and Chicagoland where he finished 21st in both events.

In 2017, he and his race team attempted 6 ARCA Racing Series races over the course of the year, scoring a win at the Nashville Fairgrounds in the early spring.

In 2018, he attempted two Truck Series races with his team at Gateway Motorsports Park and at Bristol Motor Speedway respectively. He finished an impressive 6th place with their first attempt at Gateway after avoiding some of the late race chaos in the end. While they qualified well at Bristol, the team fell out of the race early. He later ran the Martinsville fall race with Reaume Brothers Racing, but a wreck towards the end of stage 1 derailed their chances of a good run, finishing 32nd.

For the 2019 season, Chad Finley Racing increased their Truck Series schedule to a full-time slate, hiring Robby Lyons to share the No. 42 with Finley starting with the NextEra Energy 250 at Daytona International Speedway. After the Ultimate Tailgating 200 at Atlanta Motor Speedway, the team's hauler and trucks inside were damaged in an accident while leaving the track, forcing them to miss the following week's Strat 200 at Las Vegas Motor Speedway.

Motorsports career results

NASCAR
(key) (Bold – Pole position awarded by qualifying time. Italics – Pole position earned by points standings or practice time. * – Most laps led.)

Nationwide Series

Gander Outdoors Truck Series

K&N Pro Series East

K&N Pro Series West

 Season still in progress
 Ineligible for series points

ARCA Racing Series
(key) (Bold – Pole position awarded by qualifying time. Italics – Pole position earned by points standings or practice time. * – Most laps led.)

References

External links
 

1992 births
People from DeWitt, Michigan
Living people
NASCAR drivers
ARCA Menards Series drivers